The Ishpeming–Negaunee Unions was the final moniker of the minor league baseball teams based in Ishpeming and Negaunee, Michigan. From 1890 to 1892, Ishpeming–Negaunee teams played as members of the Upper Peninsula League in 1890 and 1891 and Wisconsin-Michigan League in 1892. The franchise hosted home games at the Ishpeming Grounds in the 1890 and 1891 seasons and Union Park in 1892.

History
Prior to minor league play, the two towns were noted to have amateur teams beginning in 1874, playing in a game won by the Ishpeming Mutuals 37–15 over Negaunee.

Ishpeming and Negaunee teams both began minor league play in 1890. The Ishpeming and Negaunee teams became charter members of the six–team Independent-level Upper Peninsula League. The Calumet Red Jackets, Hancock, Houghton and Marquette Undertakers teams joined Ishpeming and Negaunee in beginning league play.

In their first season of minor league play, the Ishpeming team ended the 1890 season with a 19–16 record under manager Jim Tray and Negaunee folded before the season concluded with Bert Cook managing the team. Ishpeming placed 2nd in the final standings and finished 4.0 games behind the 1st place Houghton team and ahead of the 3rd place Marquette Undertakers and the 4th place Calumet Red Jackets. The teams from Hancock and Negaunee folded before the season concluded, with final records unknown.

In 1891, Ishpeming continued play and placed 3rd in the four–team Upper Peninsula League. With a final record of 24–30, playing under manager Jim Tray, Ishpeming finished 8.0 games behind the 1st place Calumet Red Jackets. The Upper Peninsula League permanently folded following the 1891 season.

The Ishpeming–Negaunee Unions team continued play in 1892, as the cities combined to field the team. The Unions became charter members of the six–team Independent-level Wisconsin–Michigan League. The Green Bay, Marinette Badgers, Marquette Undertakers, Menominee and Oshkosh Indians teams joined Ishpeming–Negaunee in league play.

In their final season of play, the Unions folded during the season. On August 5, 1892, Marquette folded with a record of 20–29 and then Ishpeming–Negaunee was dropped August 9, 1892, because of the distance for the remaining teams to travel. Joe Quest was the Unions' manager, as the team finished with a 24–20 record when folding. The Green Bay Bays were the league champions as the Wisconsin–Michigan League permanently folded after the 1892 season.

Ishpeming has not hosted another minor league team.

The ballparks
In 1890 and 1891, the Ishpeming team hosted minor league home games at the Ishpeming Grounds.

The 1892 Ishpeming–Negaunee Unions played minor league home games at the Union Park. The ballpark was referenced to have been located at the fairgrounds between Ishpeming and Negaunee. It was noted that in 1919, the park hosted a Green Bay Packers football game. Today, it is reported the ballpark site lies along the Iron Ore Heritage Trail, which runs between Ishpeming and Negaunee.

Timeline

Year–by–year record

Notable alumni

Charlie Abbey (1892)
Bill Garfield (1892)
Moxie Hengel (1892)
Youngy Johnson (1892)
Mike Morrison (1892)
Tom O'Meara (1892)
Joe Quest (1892, MGR)
George Rooks (1892)
Wally Taylor (1892)
Joe Walsh (1892)

See also
Ishpeming–Negaunee Unions players

References

External links
 Baseball Reference

Defunct minor league baseball teams
Defunct baseball teams in Michigan
Baseball teams established in 1892
Baseball teams disestablished in 1892
Marquette County, Michigan
Wisconsin-Michigan League teams